Blankenship Glacier is a steep glacier which descends north between La Count Mountain and Bubble Spur to enter upper Ferrar Glacier, Victoria Land. It was named by the Advisory Committee on Antarctic Names in 1992 after Donald D. Blankenship a Senior Research Scientist at the Jackson School of Geosciences; Geophysical and Polar Research Center, University of Wisconsin; geophysical researcher at Dome Charlie in East Antarctica for several seasons, 1978–82; researcher of Siple Coast ice streams in West Antarctica, 1983–88; at Byrd Polar Research Center, Ohio State University, from 1989.

References
 

Glaciers of Scott Coast